The Greco-Italian War (Greek: Ελληνοϊταλικός Πόλεμος, Ellinoïtalikós Pólemos), also called the Italo-Greek War, Italian Campaign in Greece, and the War of '40 in Greece, took place between the kingdoms of Italy and Greece from 28 October 1940 to 23 April 1941. This local war began the Balkans Campaign of World War II between the Axis powers and the Allies and eventually turned into the Battle of Greece with British and German involvement. On 10 June 1940, Italy declared war on France and the United Kingdom. By September 1940, the Italians had invaded France, British Somaliland and Egypt. This was followed by a hostile press campaign in Italy against Greece, accused of being a British ally. A number of provocations culminated in the sinking of the Greek light cruiser Elli by the Italians on 15 August. On 28 October, Mussolini issued an ultimatum to Greece demanding the cession of Greek territory, which the Prime Minister of Greece, Ioannis Metaxas, rejected.

Italy's invasion of Greece, launched with the divisions of the Royal Army based in Italian-controlled Albania, badly armed and poorly commanded, resulted in a setback: the Italians encountered unexpectedly tenacious resistance by the Hellenic Army and had to contend with the mountainous and muddy terrain on the Albanian–Greek border; with British air and material support, the Greeks stopped the Italian invasion just inside Greek territory by mid-November and subsequently counter-attacked with the bulk of their mobilized army to push the Italians back into Albania – an advance which culminated in the Capture of Klisura Pass in January 1941, a few dozen kilometers inside the Albanian border. The defeat of the Italian invasion and the Greek counter-offensive of 1940 have been called the "first Axis setback of the entire war" by Mark Mazower, the Greeks "surprising everyone with the tenacity of their resistance".

The front stabilized in February 1941, by which time the Italians had reinforced the Albanian front to 28 divisions against the Greeks' 14 divisions (though Greek divisions were larger). In March, the Italians conducted the unsuccessful Spring Offensive. At this point, losses were mutually costly, but the Greeks had far less ability than the Italians to replenish their losses in both men and materiel, and they were dangerously low on ammunition and other supplies. They also lacked the ability to rotate out their men and equipment, unlike the Italians. Requests by the Greeks to the British for material aid only partly alleviated the situation, and by April 1941 the Greek Army only possessed one more month's worth of heavy artillery ammunition and was unable to properly equip and mobilize the bulk of its 200,000–300,000 strong reserves.

Adolf Hitler decided that the increased British intervention in the conflict represented a threat to Germany's rear, while German build-up in the Balkans accelerated after Bulgaria joined the Axis on 1 March 1941. British ground forces began arriving in Greece the next day. This caused Hitler to come to the aid of his Axis ally. On 6 April, the Germans invaded northern Greece ("Operation Marita"). The Greeks had deployed the vast majority of their men into a mutually costly stalemate with the Italians on the Albanian front, leaving the fortified Metaxas Line with only a third of its authorized strength. Greek and British forces in northern Greece were overwhelmed and the Germans advanced rapidly west and south. In Albania, the Greek army made a belated withdrawal to avoid being cut off by the Germans but was followed up slowly by the Italians. Greece surrendered to German troops on 20 April 1941 and to the Italians on 23 April 1941. Greece was subsequently occupied by Bulgarian, German and Italian troops. The Italian army suffered 102,064 combat casualties (with 13,700 dead and 3,900 missing) and fifty thousand wounded; the Greeks suffered over 90,000 combat casualties (including 14,000 killed and 5,000 missing) and an unknown number of wounded.

Background

Italian imperialism

In the late 1920s, Italian Prime Minister Benito Mussolini said that Fascist Italy needed Spazio vitale, an outlet for its surplus population and that it would be in the best interests of other countries to aid in the expansion of Imperial Italy. The regime wanted hegemony in the Mediterranean–Danubian–Balkan region and Mussolini imagined the conquest "of an empire stretching from the Strait of Gibraltar to the Strait of Hormuz".

There were designs for a protectorate over the Albanian Kingdom and for the annexation of Dalmatia and economic and military control of the Kingdom of Yugoslavia and the Kingdom of Greece. The fascist regime also sought to establish protectorates over the First Austrian Republic, the Kingdom of Hungary, the Kingdom of Romania and the Kingdom of Bulgaria, which lay on the periphery of an Italian European sphere of influence.

In 1935, Italy began the Second Italo-Ethiopian War to expand the empire; a more aggressive Italian foreign policy which "exposed [the] vulnerabilities" of the British and French and created an opportunity the Fascist regime needed to realize its imperial goals. In 1936, the Spanish Civil War began and Italy made a military contribution so vast that it played a decisive role in the victory of the rebel forces of Francisco Franco. "A full-scale external war" was fought for Spanish subservience to the Italian Empire, to place Italy on a war footing, and to create "a warrior culture".

In September 1938, the Italian army had made plans to invade Albania, which began on 7 April 1939, and in three days had occupied most of the country. Albania was a territory that Italy could acquire for "living space to ease its overpopulation" as well as a foothold for expansion in the Balkans. Italy invaded France in June 1940, followed by their invasion of Egypt in September. A plan to invade Yugoslavia was drawn up, but postponed due to opposition from Nazi Germany and a lack of Italian army transport.

Greek–Italian relations in the interwar period
Italy had captured the predominantly Greek-inhabited Dodecanese Islands in the Aegean Sea from the Ottoman Empire in the Italo-Turkish War of 1912. It had occupied them since, after reneging on the 1919 Venizelos–Tittoni agreement to cede them to Greece. When the Italians found that Greece had been promised land in Anatolia at the Paris Peace Conference, 1919, for aid in the defeat of the Ottoman Empire during the First World War, the Italian delegation withdrew from the conference for several months. Italy occupied parts of Anatolia which threatened the Greek occupation zone and the city of Smyrna. Greek troops were landed and the Greco-Turkish War (1919–22) began with Greek troops advanced into Anatolia. Turkish forces eventually defeated the Greeks and with Italian aid, recovered the lost territory, including Smyrna. In 1923, Mussolini used the murder of an Italian general on the Greco-Albanian border as a pretext to bombard and temporarily occupy Corfu, the most important of the Ionian Islands.

The Greek defeat in Anatolia and the signing of the Treaty of Lausanne (1923) ended the expansionist Megali Idea. Henceforth Greek foreign policy was largely aimed at preserving the status quo. Territorial claims to Northern Epirus (southern Albania), the Italian-ruled Dodecanese, and British-ruled Cyprus remained open but inactive in view of the country's weakness and isolation. The main threat Greece faced was from Bulgaria, which claimed Greece's northern territories. The years after 1923 were marked by almost complete diplomatic isolation and unresolved disputes with practically every neighbouring country. The dictatorship of Theodoros Pangalos in 1925–26 sought to revise the Treaty of Lausanne by a war with Turkey. To this end, Pangalos sought Italian diplomatic support, as Italy still had ambitions in Anatolia, but in the event, nothing came of his overtures to Mussolini. After the fall of Pangalos and the restoration of relative political stability in 1926, efforts were undertaken to normalize relations with Turkey, Yugoslavia, Albania and Romania, without much success at first. The same period saw Greece draw closer to Britain and away from France, exacerbated by a dispute over the two sides' financial claims from World War I.

The Greek government put renewed emphasis on improving relations with Italy and in November 1926, a trade agreement was signed between the two states. Initiated and energetically pursued by Andreas Michalakopoulos, the Italian–Greek rapprochement had a positive impact on Greek relations with Romania and Turkey and after 1928 was continued by the new government of Eleftherios Venizelos. This policy culminated with the signing of a treaty of friendship on 23 September 1928. Mussolini exploited this treaty, as it aided in his efforts to diplomatically isolate Yugoslavia from potential Balkan allies. An offer of alliance between the two countries was rebuffed by Venizelos but during the talks Mussolini personally offered "to guarantee Greek sovereignty" on Macedonia and assured Venizelos that in case of an external attack on Thessaloniki by Yugoslavia, Italy would join Greece.

During the late 1920s and early 1930s, Mussolini sought diplomatically to create "an Italian-dominated Balkan bloc that would link Turkey, Greece, Bulgaria, and Hungary". Venizelos countered the policy with diplomatic agreements among Greek neighbours and established an "annual Balkan conference ... to study questions of common interest, particularly of an economic nature, with the ultimate aim of establishing some kind of regional union". This increased diplomatic relations and by 1934 was resistant to "all forms of territorial revisionism". Venizelos adroitly maintained a principle of "open diplomacy" and was careful not to alienate traditional Greek patrons in Britain and France. The Greco-Italian friendship agreement ended Greek diplomatic isolation and led to a series of bilateral agreements, most notably the Greco-Turkish Friendship Convention in 1930. This process culminated in the signature of the Balkan Pact between Greece, Yugoslavia, Turkey and Romania, which was a counter to Bulgarian revisionism.

The Second Italo-Ethiopian War marked a renewal of Italian expansionism, and began a period where Greece increasingly sought a firm British commitment for its security. Although Britain offered guarantees to Greece (as well as Turkey and Yugoslavia) for the duration of the Ethiopian crisis, it was unwilling to commit itself further so as to avoid limiting its freedom of manoeuvre vis-à-vis Italy. Furthermore, with the (British-backed) restoration of the Greek monarchy in 1935 in the person of the anglophile King George II, Britain had secured its dominant influence in the country. This did not change after the establishment of the dictatorial 4th of August Regime of Ioannis Metaxas in 1936. Although imitating the Fascist regime in Italy in its ideology and outward appearance, the regime lacked a mass popular base, and its main pillar was the King, who commanded the allegiance of the army. Greek foreign policy thus remained aligned with that of Britain, despite the parallel ever-growing economic penetration of the country by Nazi Germany. Metaxas himself, although an ardent Germanophile in World War I, followed this line, and after the Munich Conference in October 1938 suggested a British–Greek alliance to the British ambassador, arguing that Greece "should prepare for the eventuality of a war between Great Britain and Italy, which sooner or later Greece would find itself drawn into". Loath to be embroiled in a possible Greek–Bulgarian war, dismissive of Greece's military ability, and disliking the regime, the British rebuffed the offer.

Prelude to war, 1939–40

On 4 February 1939, Mussolini addressed the Fascist Grand Council on foreign policy. The speech outlined Mussolini's belief that Italy was being imprisoned by France and the United Kingdom and what territory would be needed to break free. During this speech, Mussolini declared Greece to be a "vital [enemy] of Italy and its expansion." On 18 March, as signs for an imminent Italian invasion of Albania as well as a possible attack on Corfu mounted, Metaxas wrote in his diary of his determination to resist any Italian attack.

Following the Italian annexation of Albania in April, relations between Italy and Greece deteriorated rapidly. The Greeks began making defensive preparations for an Italian attack, while the Italians began improving infrastructure in Albania to facilitate troop movements. The new Italian ambassador, Emanuele Grazzi, arrived in Athens later in April. During his tenure, Grazzi worked earnestly for the improvement of Italian–Greek relations, something that Metaxas too desired—despite his anglophile stance, Grazzi considered him "the only real friend Italy could claim in Greece"—but he was in the awkward position of being ignorant of his country's actual policy towards Greece: he had arrived with no instructions whatsoever, and was constantly left out of the loop thereafter, frequently receiving no replies to his dispatches. Tensions mounted as a result of a continued anti-Greek campaign in the Italian press, combined with provocative Italian actions. Thus during Foreign Minister Galeazzo Ciano's visit to Albania, posters supporting Albanian irredentism in Chameria were publicly displayed; the governor of the Italian Dodecanese, Cesare Maria De Vecchi, closed the remaining Greek communal schools in the province, and Italian troops were heard singing  "Andremo nell'Egeo, prenderemo pure il Pireo. E, se tutto va bene, prenderemo anche Aténe." ("We go to the Aegean, and will take even Piraeus. And if all goes well, we will take Athens too."). Four of the five Italian divisions in Albania moved towards the Greek border, and on 16 August the Italian Chief of the General Staff, Marshal Pietro Badoglio, received orders to begin planning for an attack on Greece. On 4 August, Metaxas had ordered Greek forces to a state of readiness and a partial mobilization.

Between 24 and 30 November, I Corps moved north into Albania along the Drinos river, while II Corps moved in the direction of Frashër, which it captured in early December. TSDM continued to apply pressure against the Italians and the 10th Division captured Moscopole on 24 November. Pogradec was captured unopposed by the 13th Division on 30 November. The continued Greek advance caused another crisis in the Italian hierarchy. The news of the fall of Pogradec and the pessimistic reports of the Italian commanders in Albania reportedly caused Mussolini to consider asking for a truce through the Germans but in the end he recovered his nerve and ordered Soddu to hold fast. The Greeks would be worn out, since they had "... no war industry and can only count on supplies from Great Britain". Mussolini, encouraged by the hardline Fascist Party secretary Roberto Farinacci, sacked Badoglio on 4 December and replaced him with Ugo Cavallero as Chief of the General Staff. The resignation of the governor of the Italian Dodecanese, Cesare Maria De Vecchi and Admiral Cavagnari, followed within a few days.

I Corps captured Delvinë on 5 December and Gjirokastër on 8 December; the Lioumbas Detachment captured Sarandë— renamed Porto Edda after Edda Mussolini—on 6 December. Further east, the 2nd Division captured the Suhë Pass after a fierce struggle from 1–4 December, while 8th Division launched repeated attacks on the heights around the Kakavia Pass, forcing the Italians to withdraw on the night of 4/5 December. The division had suffered considerable losses but took over 1,500 prisoners, several artillery pieces and thirty tanks. In the TSDM sector, Lieutenant-General Kosmas (in command of the K Group, essentially the 10th Division) captured the Ostravicë Mountain on 12 December, while III Corps—since 1 December reinforced with 17th Division, which replaced 13th Division—completed its occupation of the Kamia massif and secured Pogradec.

On 2 December, Papagos, and Crown Prince Paul, visited the front. Pitsikas and Tsolakoglou urged him to order an immediate attack on the strategic Klisura Pass, without waiting for I and II Corps to level with TSDM. Papagos refused and ordered the plan to continue, with III Corps relegated to a passive role. (This decision was later criticized, coupled with the onset of winter, it immobilised the Greek right wing. Despite the atrocious weather and the heavy snowfall, the Greek offensive continued on the left throughout December. I Corps, now comprising 2nd, 3rd and 4th Divisions (8th Division and the Lioumbas Detachment were moved back into reserve) captured Himarë on 22 December. II Corps, moving between the Aöos and the Apsos rivers, reached the vicinity of Klisura, but failed to capture the pass. To its right, the V Army Corps (the former K Group but still comprising only the 10th Division) managed to advance up to Mount Tomorr and secure the connection between II and III Corps, which remained in their positions.

End of the Greek offensive (6 January – 6 April 1941)

On 28 December 1940, the Greek GHQ took the decision to halt large-scale offensive operations in view of the stiffening Italian resistance, the worsening supply situation and the bad weather, which inter alia led to a large number of frostbite casualties. This decision took effect on 6 January, whereby only local offensive operations would take place to improve Greek lines until the weather improved. The Italians had eleven infantry divisions, (11th Infantry Division "Brennero", 19th Infantry Division "Venezia", 23rd Infantry Division "Ferrara", 29th Infantry Division "Piemonte", 33rd Infantry Division "Acqui", 37th Infantry Division "Modena", 48th Infantry Division "Taro", 49th Infantry Division "Parma", 51st Infantry Division "Siena", 53rd Infantry Division "Arezzo", and 56th Infantry Division "Casale") and four Alpine divisions (2nd Alpine Division "Tridentina", 3rd Alpine Division "Julia", 4th Alpine Division "Cuneense", and 5th Alpine Division "Pusteria") and the 131st Armored Division "Centauro", with the 6th Infantry Division "Cuneo" and the 7th Infantry Division "Lupi di Toscana" moving to the front. There were also two independent Bersaglieri regiments, a grenadier regiment, two cavalry regiments, Blackshirt and Albanian battalions and other units. According to official Italian documents, on 1 January 1941, Italy had 10,616 officers, 261,850 men, 7,563 vehicles, and 32,871 animals in Albania. This strengthening of the Italian position prompted Cavallero, who after Soddu's recall on 29 December combined his post as Chief of the General Staff with the overall command in Albania, to pronounce that the "period of crisis [was] almost overcome" and to begin planning for an attack aiming to recapture Korçë in early February.

Struggle for Klisura Pass and Tepelenë

The main operation envisaged by the Greek GHQ was the capture of the Klisura Pass by II Corps, coupled with minor offensives by I Corps and TSDM to improve their positions. II Corps attacked on 8 January, with 1st Division on the left and 15th Division, followed by the 11th Division, on the right flank. The 15th Division faced the Julia Division, and after a hard struggle managed to capture its positions in a costly success. The 11th Division followed up on 9 January next day captured the pass. The offensive forced Cavallero to deploy the reserves he had husbanded for the Korçë offensive, which never took place. The newly arrived Lupi di Toscana division was routed. The division went into action on 9 January to support the Julia Division, after a 24-hour forced march in horrendous weather, without having time to reconnoitre the front, without maps and without coordinating fire support with the Julia Division. The commander and the chief of staff failed to coordinate its two regiments, which became entangled on the same mule track. Despite attacking downhill and facing a numerically inferior enemy, the division lost a battalion to encirclement and were driven back to their starting positions after two days. By 16 January, the division had disintegrated and "ceased to exist as an organized force", with only 160 officers and men immediately available and over 4,000 casualties. On 26 January, the Italians counter-attacked to recover the pass but II Corps, reinforced with 5th Division, managed to repel them and then counter-attacked. In the Battle of Trebeshina, a series of engagements from 2–12 February, the Trebeshinë massif was captured. The capture of the strategic Klisura pass by the Greek army was considered a major success by the Allied forces, with the Commander of the British forces in the Middle East, Archibald Wavell, sending a congratulatory message to Alexander Papagos.

As the threat of a German invasion from Bulgaria increased, the need to transfer Greek divisions to the Bulgarian frontier forced Papagos to launch a final effort to capture Valona as quickly as possible. The RAF agreed to challenge the air superiority of the Regia Aeronautica, which had recovered with the loss of much of the RHAF in ground-attack operations, rather than continue ineffective attempts at interdiction. With reinforcements from Egypt and the drying of a landing-ground at Paramythia, the RAF managed  support sorties by the end of February. Launched in mid-February, the attack saw I Corps gain ground towards Tepelenë; Italian resistance and a deterioration in the weather forced a suspension of operations before Tepelenë, let alone Valona or Berat, were reached. The Italian defensive success was costly, and signs of an imminent Italian offensive in the central sector of the front forced a return to the defensive.

By early February 1941, the Greek Army was down to less than two months of artillery ammunition overall and had shortages in every area of material, while the Italians possessed ample reserves, endangering their position. The Greeks appealed to the United States for material aid,
but the British ensured that they themselves got first priority for US production. Furthermore, there were shortages of materials and even food across the country. Continuing degradation of their logistical capability would soon mean the end of effective Greek resistance.
British material and air support had been provided, but at this point it was "relatively small." Further British aid in March and April would only partially alleviate this problem.

On 14 February, in view of GHQ's increasing concern with developments on the Bulgarian frontier, a new higher command, the Epirus Army Section (TSI), under Lieutenant-General Markos Drakos, was formed, comprising I and II Corps. Despite Greek success in Albania, dissension within the Greek leadership emerged over strategy towards the expected German attack and the need for a withdrawal in Albania. The front commanders in Albania represented their views to GHQ in Athens and in early March, Papagos moved to replace virtually the entire leadership in the Albanian front: Drakos, Kosmas and Papadopoulos, the commanders of TSI, I and II Corps respectively, were replaced by the TSDM commander Lieutenant-General Pitsikas, Lieutenant-General Demestichas and Major-General Georgios Bakos, TSDM being taken over by Tsolakoglou.

Italian Spring Offensive

On 4 March, the British sent the first convoy of Operation Lustre with W Force (Lieutenant-General Sir Henry Maitland Wilson) and supplies for Greece. The Italian leadership desired to achieve a success against the Greek army before the impending German intervention and reinforced the Albanian front to 28 divisions with an average of 26 serviceable bombers, 150 fighters, along with 134 bombers and 54 fighters of the 4° Squadra in Italy. The attack would be carried out by the VIII Army Corps (24th Infantry Division "Pinerolo", 38th Infantry Division "Puglie", and 59th Infantry Division "Cagliari"), with XXV Corps (2nd Infantry Division "Sforzesca", 47th Infantry Division "Bari", 51st Infantry Division "Siena", and 7th Infantry Division "Lupi di Toscana") as a second echelon, and the Centauro and Piemonte divisions as general reserves. The Greek units opposite them were II Corps (17th, 5th, 1st, 15th, and 11th Divisions), with three regiments as TSI's general reserve, and 4th Division providing reinforcement. II Corps continued limited offensive action as late as 8 March to improve its positions.

The Italian attack, watched by Mussolini, began on 9 March, with a heavy artillery barrage and air bombardment; on the main sector, held by the Greek 1st Division, over 100,000 shells were dropped on a  front. Despite repeated assaults and heavy shelling, the positions of 1st Division held during 9–10 March. A flanking manoeuvre on 11 March ended in Italian defeat. The exhausted Puglie Division was withdrawn and replaced with the Bari Division during the subsequent night, but all attacks until 15 March failed. The Italian offensive halted on 16–18 March, allowing the Greeks to bring reserves forward and begin a gradual reshuffle their line, relieving the 1st Division with the 17th. The Italian offensive resumed on 19 March with another attack on Height 731 (the 18th thus far). Attacks, preceded by heavy artillery bombardments, followed daily until 24 March, the last day of the Italian offensive, without achieving any result. Mussolini admitted that the result of the Italian offensive was zero. Italian casualties amounted to over 11,800 dead and wounded, while the Greeks suffered 1,243 dead, 4,016 wounded and 42 missing in action.

Greek and Italian logistical situation in early 1941
Although it failed, the Italian Spring Offensive revealed a "chronic shortage of arms and equipment" in the Greek Army. Even with British support, the Greeks were fast approaching the end of their logistical tether. British intelligence estimated that Greece's reserves, although numbering 200,000–300,000 partly-trained men on paper, could not be mobilized for lack of arms and equipment, which were being consumed by the Albanian front. By the end of March 1941, the Greek Army possessed one month's supply in various types of
artillery ammunition. The British had already supplied, among other goods, 40 million 7.92 rounds and 150 mortars (50 51mm and 100 76mm) the previous month, but had not yet fulfilled the Greeks' mid-January request of 300,000 uniforms and sets of shoes.

The Italians still had reserves of men and materiel, the Greek defences of Macedonia and Thrace, which would face the German attack, were left undermanned and underequipped due to the demands of the Albanian front. The Eastern Macedonia Army Section (TSAM), which manned the Metaxas Line, was left with only 70,000 men to defend against any potential German advance, though plans called for the fortifications to be held by 200,000 men. British planners disagreed with the Greek plan to hold on to the Metaxas Line, as well as the insistence of not ceding a single bit of ground to the Italians, noting that the Greek forces were insufficient to prevent or resist a German breakthrough. The Central Macedonia Army Section (TSKM), which manned the Yugoslav border, was even weaker: its three divisions were recently raised from reserves and possessed no anti-air weaponry, anti-tank weaponry, armored vehicles, or almost any motor vehicles. They had few automatic weapons and faced even shortages of basic supplies such as tents and helmets. 14 out of the 20 available divisions of the Greek army were facing the Italians on the Albanian front as part of the Epirus Army Section, totaling 33 regiments. In an effort to keep Greece in the fight, British aid drastically stepped up in March and April, which included uniforms, weapons, and ammunition of various types. However, the Greeks still did not consider this sufficient for successfully prosecuting the rest of the war.

Though the Greek forces faced logistical difficulties their supply lines worked much better. On the other side, Italian supplies and ammunition faced critical levels even after one month of military operations. In general Italian logistics failed to keep up with the confusing movements of the Italian units, as a result they were perennially lacking essential supplies. Italian General Gabriele Nasci realized that the Greek units were far more familiar in mountain warfare and could always employ local guides and provisions, thus freeing them from concern with supply line and enable them to attack in more flexible way. Indeed the area that the conflicts took place was far more familiar to the Greek soldiers than to the Italians. The Greek side was far more familiar in mountain warfare considering also the fact that many Greeks especially those natives of Epirus were fighting for their homes. Additionally some Greek weapons were superior to their Italian counterparts: the Hotchkiss machine gun outperformed the Italian Breda and Fiat equivalent and was less liable to overheating as well as jammed less often. The Skoda 75 mm and 105mm mountain artillery of the Greek army was also superior compared to Italian mortars.

As such at March 29, Italian General Mario Roatta, Chief of the Italian General Staff, asked for German intervention to relieve the pressure on his own formations. On the other hand just before the German intervention at April 1941, Greek, British and Yugoslav officers agreed that a joined Greek-Yugoslavian operation will lead to the final push the will and force the Italians throw the Italians into the Adriatic. Orders given by General Papagos dictated the advance of the Epirus Army towards Vlore and Berat, while the West Macedonia Army would cut the remaining Italian units located in Elbasan and Durres. Additionally, Papagos advised the Yugoslav side to advance in the direction of Durres, Kukes and Elbasan. A swift Italian defeat would free up forces that could be used for the defence of Macedonia against a German threat.

German invasion

With most of the Greek army on the Albanian border, Operation Marita began through Bulgaria on 6 April, which created a second front. Greece had received a small reinforcement from British forces based in Egypt in anticipation of the German attack, but no more help was sent after the invasion. The Greek army was outnumbered; the Bulgarian defensive line did not receive adequate troop reinforcements and was quickly overrun. The Germans outflanked the immobile Greek forces on the Albanian border, forcing the surrender of the Eastern Macedonia Field Army section in only four days. The British Empire forces began a retreat. For several days Allied troops contained the German advance on the Thermopylae position, allowing ships to be prepared to evacuate the British force. The Germans reached Athens on 27 April and the southern shore on 30 April, capturing  troops. The conquest of Greece was completed with the capture of Crete a month later and Greece was occupied by the military forces of Germany, Italy, and Bulgaria until late 1944.

On 6 April, Papagos ordered TSDM to launch an attack towards Elbasan, in conjunction with Yugoslav forces. The attack began on 7 April and the 13th Division made some progress, but the Yugoslav army, attacked by the Germans, rapidly collapsed and the operation was cancelled. On 12 April, GHQ in Athens ordered the Greek forces on the Albanian front to retreat but the decision was too late. The Greek commanders knew that Italian pressure, the lack of motor transport and pack animals, the physical exhaustion of the Greek army, and the poor transport network of Epirus meant that any retreat was likely to end in disintegration. Advice to retreat before the start of the German attack had been rejected and they petitioned Pitsikas to surrender. Pitsikas forbade such talk, but notified Papagos and urged a solution that would secure "the salvation and honour of our victorious Army". The order to retreat, the disheartening news of the Yugoslav collapse, and the rapid German advance in Macedonia led to a breakdown of morale in the Greek troops, many of whom had been fighting without rest for five months and were forced to abandon hard-won ground. By 15 April, the divisions of II Army Corps, beginning with the 5th Division, began to disintegrate, with men and even entire units abandoning their positions.

On 16 April, Pitsikas reported to Papagos that signs of disintegration had also begun to appear among the divisions of I Corps and begged him to "save the army from the Italians" by allowing it to capitulate to the Germans, before the military situation collapsed completely. On the following day TSDM was renamed III Army Corps and placed under Pitsikas' command. The three corps commanders, along with the metropolitan bishop of Ioannina, Spyridon, pressured Pitsikas to unilaterally negotiate with the Germans. When he refused, the others decided to bypass him and selected Tsolakoglou, as the senior of the three generals, to carry out the task. Tsolakoglou delayed for a few days, sending his chief of staff to Athens to secure permission from Papagos. The chief of staff reported the chaos in Athens and urged his commander to take the initiative in a message that implied permission by Papagos, although this was not in fact the case. On 20 April, Tsolakoglou contacted  Sepp Dietrich, the commander of the nearest German unit, the Leibstandarte SS Adolf Hitler (LSSAH) brigade, to offer surrender. The protocol of surrender was signed by Tsolakoglou and Dietrich at 18:00 on the same day. Presented with the fait accompli an hour later, Pitsikas resigned his command.

Sea and air campaign

Naval operations

Thoroughly outclassed by the far larger and more modern Italian Regia Marina, the Royal Hellenic Navy (RHN) was unable to attempt a direct naval confrontation. The RHN carried out limited operations against Italian shipping in the Strait of Otranto with submarines (losing one vessel), sinking at least  of transport and merchant shipping, but lack of maintenance facilities made it impossible to continue the effort. However, the Greek submarine force was too small to be able to seriously hinder the supply lines between Italy and Albania; between 28 October 1940 and 30 April 1941 Italian ships made 3,305 voyages across the Otranto straits, carrying 487,089 military personnel (including 22 field divisions) and 584,392 tons of supplies while losing overall only seven merchant ships and one escort ship. Destroyers carried out bold but fruitless night raids on 14 November 1940, 15 December and 4 January 1941.

The British fought the Battle of the Strait of Otranto on 12 November acting as a decoy force and the Regia Marina had half of its capital ships put out of action by the British Royal Navy (RN) during the Battle of Taranto  but Italian cruisers and destroyers continued to escort convoys between Italy and Albania. On 28 November, an Italian squadron bombarded Corfu and on 18 December and 4 March, Italian task forces shelled Greek coastal positions in Albania. From January 1941, the main task of the RHN was to escort the convoys of Operation Excess to and from Alexandria, in co-operation with the RN. As the convoys transporting Lustre Force began in early March, the Italian Fleet sortied against them and the British were forewarned by Ultra decrypts. The Mediterranean Fleet intercepted the Italians at the Battle of Cape Matapan on 28 March and sank three cruisers and two destroyers, the greatest Italian naval defeat at sea of the war.

Air operations

Regia Aeronautica
The poor infrastructure in Albania air bases hindered communications and movements between the Italian flying units.  Only two airfields – Tirana and Valona – had Macadam runways so Autumn and Winter weather made operations more difficult. There was also the usual lack of co-operation with Italian Navy and Army. Two days after the start of the war, on 30 October, there was the first air battle. Some Henschel Hs126s of 3/2 Flight of 3 Observation Mira took off to locate Italian Army columns. But they were intercepted and attacked by Fiat CR.42s of 393a Squadriglia. A first Henschel was hit and crashed, killing its observer, Pilot Officer Evanghelos Giannaris, the first Greek aviator to die in the war. A second Hs 126 was downed over Mount Smolikas, killing Pilot Officer Lazaros Papamichail and Sergeant Constantine Yemenetzis.

Royal Hellenic Air Force

On 2 November, a squadron of 15 Italian CANT Z.1007 bombers, with Fiat CR.42 fighter escorts headed towards Thessaloniki and was intercepted by Greek PZL P.24 fighters of the 22nd Squadron. Second Lieutenant Marinos Mitralexis shot down one bomber and being out of ammunition, aimed the nose of his PZL P. 24 at the tail of a bomber, smashed the rudder and sent the bomber out of control. The news of Mitralexis' feat quickly spread throughout Greece and boosted morale. On 2 December, the 21st Pursuit Squadron re-equipped with 14 ex-RAF Gladiators.

RAF

The bombing effort was concentrated on Durazzo and Valona but some close support operations were carried out and the fighters near Athens helped to reduce the number of Italian raids. By the end of 1940, the Gladiator pilots had claimed  shot down for the loss of six, which established a measure of air superiority over the Pindus mountains. In January 1941, 11 Squadron and 112 Squadron were sent to Greece despite being at half strength. 33 Squadron, 113 Squadron (Blenheims) and 208 Squadron (Lysanders and Hurricanes) moved in March.

The British fighters were able to prevent most Italian air operations after mid-February, when the Greek army made a maximum effort to capture Valona. The RAF managed fifty sorties on  Gladiators and Hurricanes intercepted a raid by fifty Italian aircraft on 28 February, the RAF claiming  for the loss of one. When the Greek advance was slowed by more bad weather and Italian reinforcements, the RAF returned to attacks on airfields and ports.

Home front

Greece
The war was greeted with great enthusiasm by the Greek population, in Athens crowds filled the streets with patriotic fervour, as newspapers hurried to publish their newest editions to stir up the people further. The popular story that Metaxas had defiantly told Grazzi "ochi!" ("no!") on the night of 28 October 1940 made the previously unpopular prime minister into a national hero. Georgios Vlachos in an editorial in his newspaper Kathimerini wrote: "Today there is no Greek who does not add his voice to the thunderous OCHI. OCHI, we will not hand over Greece to Italy. OCHI, Italian ruffiani will not set foot on our land. OCHI, the barbarians will not desecrate our Parthenon". He also wrote his famous article "The dagger" (To stileto).

Men in Greece rushed to volunteer for the war effort, cramming into the back of trams to get to the recruiting offices. Morale amongst the troops was as high as it could get with a universal feeling that Greece must fight, with few entertaining the idea of failure. This enthusiasm was not shared by some of the political leadership, there was a sense that Greece would lose the war but needed to fight nonetheless, Metaxas stated in a letter to Winston Churchill that "The war we confront today is thus solely a war of honour" and that "The outcome of the world war will not be decided in the Balkans."

The popularity of Metaxas' regime would also receive a boost, with Metaxas becoming a national hero overnight, with even many left-wing and liberal Greeks who opposed Metaxas showing admiration and support for him, flocking to the cause.

Soon, with the first victories at the front, Greek artists started to write and sing patriotic and festive songs. The reputation of Sofia Vembo skyrocketed when her performance of patriotic and satirical songs became a major inspiration for the fighting soldiers as well as the people at large for whom she quickly became a folk heroine. Another satirical popular song named Koroido Mussolini (Mussolini fool) was written by Nikos Gounaris in the rhythm of "Reginella Campagnola", a popular Italian song of the era.

Italy
The announcement of the Italian attack was greeted with favour but not much enthusiasm, by the Italian public. The situation changed as the Italian attack devolved into a stalemate in early November, especially after the British Taranto raid and the start of the Greek counter-offensive. In private conversations, Italians soon took to calling the war in Albania "a second and worse Caporetto". The regime's popularity slumped further with the introduction of strict rationing in food, oil and fats in early December. Despite imposing a price freeze in July, prices rose and the state distribution network of staple foods and heating oil broke down.  Coupled with the dismissal of Badoglio and the British advance in North Africa in Operation Compass, it produced "the regime's most serious crisis since the murder of Giacomo Matteotti in 1924" (MacGregor Knox). In a move designed to bolster the Fascist Party's flagging standing, in mid-January 1941 Mussolini ordered the all senior gerarchi and officials under 45 years, to go to the Albanian front (much to their displeasure). According to Dino Grandi at least, this move caused much resentment against Mussolini among the Party leadership that simmered underground and resulted in his dismissal in July 1943.

On the other hand, the Greek historian Zacharias Tsirpanlis observes that while post-war Italian accounts confirm the view that "due to the Greek success Italian public opinion slowly turned against the Fascist regime, marking the beginning of the end for Mussolini", this did not yet materialize in any form of active resistance, including in the front itself. While a cynicism towards the Fascist regime and its symbols and leaders had set in, incidents of insubordination remained isolated. Indeed, according to the eyewitness account of Air Force chief Francesco Pricolo, when Mussolini made an unannounced visit to the front on 2 March 1941, the Duce was himself surprised by the enthusiasm with which he was greeted, having expected open hostility from the soldiers.

Albania
In an effort to win Albanian support for Italian rule, Ciano and the Fascist regime encouraged Albanian irredentism in the directions of Kosovo and Chameria. Despite Jacomoni's assurances of Albanian support in view of the promised "liberation" of Chameria, Albanian enthusiasm for the war was distinctly lacking. The few Albanian units raised to fight alongside the Italian Army mostly "either deserted or fled in droves". Albanian agents recruited before the war, are reported to have operated behind Greek lines and engaged in acts of sabotage but these were few in number. Support for the Greeks, although of limited nature, came primarily from the local Greek populations who warmly welcomed the arrival of the Greek forces. Despite official Greek proclamations that they were fighting for the liberation of Albania, Greek claims on Northern Epirus were well-known. Albanian suspicions were reinforced, when a new municipal council of eleven Greeks and four Albanians was appointed at Korçë, and when the military governor of Gjirokastër prohibited the celebration of the Albanian independence day on 28 November (his counterpart in Korçë allowed it to go ahead and was reprimanded). The Greek authorities even ignored offers of Albanian expatriates to enlist as volunteers against Italy. The Greek occupation regime followed the regulations of international law and the Albanian civil administration was left intact and continued to operate, including law courts. No atrocities were committed and the safes of the state bank were discovered unopened after the Greeks withdrew.

Aftermath

Analysis

Impact on Barbarossa

Hitler blamed Mussolini's "Greek fiasco" for his failed campaign in Russia. "But for the difficulties created for us by the Italians and their idiotic campaign in Greece", he commented in mid-February 1945, "I should have attacked Russia a few weeks earlier," he later said. Hitler noted that, the "pointless campaign in Greece", Germany was not notified in advance of the impending attack, which "compelled us, contrary to all our plans, to intervene in the Balkans, and that in its turn led to a catastrophic delay in the launching of our attack on Russia. We were compelled to expend some of our best divisions there. And as a net result we were then forced to occupy vast territories in which, but for this stupid show, the presence of our troops would have been quite unnecessary". "We have no luck with the Latin races", he complained afterwards. Mussolini took advantage of Hitler's preoccupation with Spain and France "to set in motion his disastrous campaign against Greece". Andreas Hillgruber has accused Hitler of trying to deflect blame for his country's defeat from himself to his ally, Italy.

Ian Kershaw wrote that the five-week delay in launching Operation Barbarossa, caused by the unusually wet weather in May 1941, was not decisive. For Kershaw, the reasons for the ultimate failure of Barbarossa lay in the arrogance of the German war goals, in particular the planning flaws and resource limitations that caused problems for the operation from the start. He adds that the German invasion into Greece in spring 1941 did not cause significant damage to tanks and other vehicles needed for Barbarossa, the equipment diverted to Greece being used on the southern flank of the attack on the Soviet Union. Von Rintelen emphasizes that although the diversion of German resources into Greece just prior to the attack on the Soviet Union did little for the latter operation, Italy's invasion of Greece did not undermine Barbarossa before the operation started. Instead, Italy's invasion of Greece was to have serious consequences for its ongoing campaign in North Africa. Moreover, Italy would have been in a better position to execute its North African campaign had it initially occupied Tunis and Malta.

Effect on Italy
In the preface to the collection of documents published in 1965 by the Italian Ministry of Foreign Affairs, the historian and diplomat Mario Toscano summed up the war as follows: "As we all know, the campaign against Greece ended in total failure. This was due, as the published material confirms, to Mussolini's conviction, based on indications he received from his colleagues, that the campaign would be decided in the political rather than the military sector. The consequences of this error were so serious as to bring about Italy's complete subjection to Germany as far as the political and military direction of the war was concerned." This has been echoed by other writers since: Gann and Duignan regarded that the fighting in France, Yugoslavia and Greece reduced Italy to the status of a [German] satellite, while Ian Kershaw considers that the Greek failure, the Battle of Taranto (11–12 November 1940) and the loss of Cyrenaica (9 December 1940 – 9 February 1941) served to end Italian aspirations to great power status. 

Other authors have been critical of the Italian leadership's handling of the operation. Jowett wrote in 2000 that Mussolini's "quick and relatively easy victory" turned to defeat and stalemate, which exposed the incompetence of the Fascist government and its war machine. Italian soldiers suffered great hardship in the Albanian mountains, "due to the incompetence and unforgivably bad planning of their leaders". In 2008, Paoletti wrote that the Italian army fought in difficult terrain, was short of clothing and equipment and units were split up as they arrived and used piecemeal. Mussolini was guilty of "criminal improvidence", in causing the great number casualties of the Italian army. The German invasion "went smoothly, because the Greek army was concentrated against the Italians". In 2009, Mazower wrote that the Italian invasion of Greece was a disaster and the "first Axis setback" of the war. Mussolini had sent  troops to attack Greece, over some of the worst mountain country in Europe, at the beginning of winter. The Greeks repulsed the invasion, to the surprise of enemies and Allies alike, an event made worse for the Fascist regime because of the attack on Taranto and the disasters in Libya, Eritrea and Ethiopia.

Several military historians have blamed the poor performance of the Italian Army in Greece, as well as in France and North Africa, on "innate defects" that had been evident already during World War I but were consistently ignored due to institutional indifference. The Italian military historian Lucio Ceva remarks that the Italian military was largely unable to learn from its failures or from the enemies it faced; as military historian Brian R. Sullivan points out, it took several decades before the historical office of the Italian General Staff published studies on Italian reverses like Caporetto or Guadalajara. Sullivan also demonstrates that the deficiencies in doctrine, training, leadership, organization and logistics that were apparent during the Spanish Civil War were simply ignored. A typical example is the testing in Spain of the new binary divisions; although they proved "too weak against opponents better armed than the Ethiopians and [...] too inflexible in maneuver", so that the Italian divisions in Spain reverted to the traditional triangular pattern in November 1937, in the very same month, Army chief of staff Pariani insisted on pressing on with the reorganization as the greater number of divisions resulting from it "would give Fascist Italy the appearance of greater military power". The diversion of large quantities of material and funds to the Spanish intervention also impacted the Italian Army negatively: according to the official Italian history of the conflict, the material left in or donated to Spain would have sufficed to provide for 55 fully equipped divisions in June 1940, rather than the 19 fully and 34 partially equipped ones in reality.

According to James Sadkovich, the effect of the Italo-Greek war has been exaggerated by other authors, because Axis victories in the spring of 1941 cancelled the Italian defeats of the previous winter. However, even he admits the adverse effect that the start of the Greek campaign had on Italy's war already under way in North Africa. Between October 1940 and May 1941, five times as many men, one and a third times as much matériel, three and a half times more merchant ships and at least twice the amount of escort vessels were deployed on the Greek operation as in North Africa. As a result, the initial numerical superiority that the Italians enjoyed over the British in the region, was not to last. Graziani deferred his advance, aware that Italian strength was insufficient to mount the major offensive through Egypt that Mussolini was urging and expecting. The Germans saw the importance of the sector and offered troops and equipment. The Comando Supremo wanted to take advantage of the offer. It could have made the difference but Mussolini refused.

Impact on Greece
Anti-Italian feeling among the Greek public, already strong, reached its peak after the sinking of "Elli" on 15 August 1940, the day of the Dormition of the Mother of God, a major Orthodox religious holiday. Greek optimism that the Italian attack would fail was evident from the first moments of the war. Besides, official propaganda, as well as the spontaneous reaction of the people created the optimism which was necessary for the first difficult moments. From the first hours of the war a strong national feeling was quite evident "to teach a lesson to the macaroni-boys" ("Makaronades"), as the Italians were pejoratively called. Various factors have contributed to the high morale of the Greek side and the subsequent repulsion of the Italian attacks: the strong belief in a just cause, the specialized and well trained military personnel of the Greek army and its leadership, as well as the devotion of the civilian population who lived next to the battlefields, including women, children and the elderly, to the Greek cause. Public opinion in Greece still accepts that the failure of the numerically superior Italian army came as a result of its unjustified action against Greece.

After the Italian troops were driven from Greek soil, Greek morale was further strengthened. The unpublished and unknown up to now documents (memoranda, letters, plans) of Ubaldo Soddu (who did not write memoirs), Commander of the Italian forces in Albania from 10 November to 30 December 1940, reveal the desperate efforts for control, the strict measures for unjustified retreats and abandonment of positions, the tragic appeal even for German help (on 24 November and 17 December). In his reports, Soddu analysed Greek offensive tactics and the bravery and the moral strength of the enemy, during this period from November–December, the Greeks used no new method of military tactics or quickly took advantage of the land left back by the Italian retreat. Mussolini, after the capture of Himara by the Greeks, wrote of the high morale that contributed to the victory of the enemy (24 December). The Greek successes against Italy helped raise morale in Allied Europe and showed that the Axis were not invincible. Inspired by these military developments, British Prime Minister, Winston Churchill, declared that "today we say that Greeks fight like heroes, from now on we will say that heroes fight like Greeks".

In 2007, Fisher wrote that although the advance of the Greek army stalled at January 1941, due to harsh winter conditions and Italian reinforcements, Greece had managed to secure a strong bridgehead in southern Albania (Northern Epirus to the Greeks). Thus, it not only delivered a humiliation to Mussolini, but also occupied an area inhabited by a substantial ethnic Greek population,

The Greco-Italian War is viewed as a triumph in Greece and often referred to as "the Epic of 40" ("Το Έπος του '40") and 28 October, the day Metaxas rejected the Italian ultimatum, is a national holiday known as Ohi Day ("Anniversary of the 'No'''").

German opinion
The difficulty Italy encountered in subduing a minor power such as Greece further lowered the opinion among the Germans of their Italian allies. German SS-Oberst-Gruppenführer Sepp Dietrich labeled the Albania campaign as one of the three "great disasters [that have] deprived the Italian Army of its former confidence", along with the Italian invasion of France and Operation Compass. He bitterly noted: "For this attack they used troops from Southern Italy- exactly what was needed for a winter campaign in mountainous country, without proper equipment, over an impracticable terrain, and without any organization in depth!". Wilhelm Keitel, commenting about the end of the campaign, said that "this miserable spectacle, laid on by our gallant ally, must have produced some hollow laughter from the Greeks."

Others among the German leadership were less critical, most notably Adolf Hitler. In his address to the Reichstag following the conclusion of the Balkan Campaign, Hitler was complimentary to the Greeks for their "extremely brave resistance", but stated that given the Greek logistical situation, German involvement was not decisive in the Greco-Italian conflict: "The Duce... was convinced that a quick decision would be arrived at one way or another in the forthcoming season. I was of the same opinion." He stated that he had no quarrel with Greece (which he had acknowledged as part of the Italian sphere anyway) and that his intervention was aimed solely at the British as he suspected that they planned to set up a threat to his rear in the vein of the Salonika front of the First World War: "the German forces, therefore, represented no assistance to Italy against Greece, but a preventive measure against the British." He further noted that by the beginning of April the Albanian campaign against the Italians "had so weakened [Greece] that its collapse had already become inevitable", and credited the Italians with having "engaged the greater part of the Greek Army." In his private correspondence in April 1942, Hitler said: "It is equally impossible to imagine what might have happened if the Italian front had not been stabilized in Albania, thanks to Mussolini; the whole of the Balkans would have been set alight at a moment when our advance towards the southeast was still in its early stages."

Casualties
The Regia Aeronautica'' had 79 aircraft destroyed (65 shot down) and more than 400 damaged, with  killed, while claiming 218 kills against Greek and British and 55 probables. (In Operation Marita, the Germans took   and  prisoners.)

In January 2018, following an agreement between the Greek and Albanian foreign ministers, a systematic effort to recover the bodies of fallen Greek soldiers from the war was undertaken between Greece and Albania. It is estimated that between 6,800 and 8,000 fallen Greek soldiers were hastily buried on location following their death, and their remains not properly identified. Work by joint Greek-Albanian teams began on 22 January in the Kelcyre Gorge, site of the Battle of Kleisoura Pass. A small number of Cham Albanian activists tried to disrupt the work but were removed by Albanian police. The remains of the Greek soldiers will be buried in the Greek military cemeteries in the Kelcyre Gorge and in the Greek minority village of Bularat (Vouliarates) near the Greek-Albanian border.

Occupation of Greece

On 13 April, Hitler issued Directive 27, including his occupation policy for Greece and jurisdiction in the Balkans with Directive No. 31 (9 June). Italy occupied the bulk of the mainland, German forces occupied Athens, Thessaloniki, Central Macedonia and several Aegean islands, including most of Crete and Florina, subject of disputed claims by Italy and Bulgaria. Bulgaria, which had not participated in the invasion, occupied most of Thrace on the same day that Tsolakoglou surrendered taking the territory between the Strymon river and a line through Alexandroupoli and Svilengrad west of the Evros River. Italian troops took over their zone of occupation from 28 April to 12 June.

Notes

Footnotes

References

Books
 
 
 
 
 

 
 
 
 
 
 
 
 
 
 
 
 
 
 
 
 Adolf Hitler, Norman Cameron, R.H. Stevens. "Hitler's Table Talk, 1941-1944: His Private Conversations" (3rd Edition). Enigma Books. 1 October 2010.

Encyclopaedias

Journal articles

Websites

Further reading

Books

Journals
 
 
 
 

 
 

 
4th of August Regime
1940 in Albania
1940 in Greece
1941 in Albania
1941 in Greece
Albania in World War II
Balkans campaign (World War II)
Battles of World War II involving Italy
Campaigns, operations and battles of World War II involving the United Kingdom
Conflicts in 1940
Conflicts in 1941
Greece in World War II
Invasions of Greece
Military history of Greece during World War II